The 1946 Middle Tennessee Blue Raiders football team represented the Middle Tennessee State College—now known as Middle Tennessee State University—as an independent during the 1946 college football season. Led by Elwin W. Midgett in his fourth season as head coach, the Blue Raiders compiled a record of 6–2–1. The team's captains were G. McIntyre and Bob Burkett.

Schedule

References

Middle Tennessee
Middle Tennessee Blue Raiders football seasons
Middle Tennessee Blue Raiders football